Michael Tyrrell (1946 – 30 May 2013) was an Antigua-born drug trafficker who headed a drug ring along with his Common law wife Julie Paterson, known as the "Cocaine Queen".  In 1999, he and his "wife" were caught by authorities attempting to smuggle nearly half a ton of cocaine from Bequia into Great Britain, one of the largest ever to be smuggled into the country.

Although born to a wealthy family, Tyrrell had previously served a prison sentence for his involvement in smuggling marijuana in Guadeloupe and Antigua during his youth. He eventually became a well known and colourful figure in the island's yachting circles and later met his wife, Julie Paterson, then the owner of a local yacht charter service.

After becoming married in 1994, he and his wife cooperated on a large scale drug trafficking operation worth $10 million. Along with his friend and criminal associate Frederic Fillingham, a former boatbuilder and sailor who had fled the United States after receiving parole on drug smuggling charges, Tyrrell contacted Robert Kavanagh who used his connections with Colombian drug cartels to secure the delivery of 396 kg of cocaine for Tyrrell's organization.

While he was apparently undetected by the Drug Enforcement Administration, Tyrrell long had a reputation for bragging of his criminal activities and operated freely within Antigua while continuing to hold meetings with known drug traffickers (including an unidentified member of a Colombian drug cartel) and recruiting members of the drug ring.

However, while thought to be safe from local officials, he was eventually discovered by British authorities and his activities soon came under Operation Eyeful, one of the largest surveillance operations ever undertaken by Customs and Police Keeping a close watch over Tyrrell and Paterson for several months, they were eventually observed unloading their cargo on a deserted beach, near Ventnor, on the Isle of Wight.

Arrested by an officer of the Customs Law Enforcement. Paterson and Fillingham were later arrested by an officer of the Customs Law Enforcement while hiding in a nearby gazebo. Tyrrell and eight others were tried at Snaresbrook Crown Court and convicted of drug trafficking charges. Tyrrell was sentenced to 26 years imprisonment while his accomplices Robert Kavanagh and Didier Andre Lebrun received 24 and 19 years imprisonment respectively. Julie Paterson was the second person to be arrested by Customs Officers, whilst sheltering with a fellow smuggler in a gazebo near Tyrells house. 
Paterson was convicted of additional charges of money laundering and sentenced to 24 years imprisonment, the longest sentence ever for a female drug trafficker.

While serving his sentence at the high-security Frankland Prison near Durham City, Tyrrell died at the University Hospital of North Durham on 30 May 2013.

References

 Whitehead, Tom. (April 29, 2002 ) PA NEWS Drug smuggler's girlfriend guilty of money laundering.
 The Scotsman (April 30, 2002) Drug money laundered. Page 6.
 The Daily Mirror (July 2, 2002) 007 pal in drug plot: Close friend of James Bond star Timothy Dalton jailed for part in a pounds 40 million  drugs plot. Section:News; Page 15.
 Daily Record (Scotland) (July 2, 2002) Cocaine baron's wife gets 4 years. Section: News; Page 19.
 PA NEWS (December 17, 2002) Operation 'eyeful': Two jailed for drug trafficking - British woman.
 Dovkants, Keith. (December 20, 2002) Evening Standard From country girl to Cocaine Queen She was a farmer's daughter who walked out on her marriage to the scion of a Norfolk dynasty for the glitz of the Caribbean yachting set. Then Julie Paterson fell obsessively in love with a self-confessed drug runner ... Page 1819.
 Kirby, Jane. (April 25, 2003) PA NEWS Money laundering woman faces more jail.
 Dowell, Ben; Clarke, Liam. (May 16, 2004) The Sunday Times (UK) IRA chief joins criminal 'elite' with Euro 50m fortune. Section: Home news; Page 9.

External links
Evening Standard: From country girl to Cocaine Queen
Cocaine queen jailed for 24 years - BBC News
'Cocaine Queen' jailed for smuggling - The Guardian

1946 births
Antigua and Barbuda expatriates in the United Kingdom
British drug traffickers
2013 deaths
Antigua and Barbuda people imprisoned abroad
Prisoners and detainees of England and Wales
Antigua and Barbuda drug traffickers